Olaizola is a Basque surname. Notable people with the surname include:

Aimar Olaizola (born 1979), Basque pelota player, known as Olaizola II, brother of Asier
Ander Olaizola (born 1989), Spanish footballer
Asier Olaizola (born 1975), Basque pelota player, known as Olaizola I
Javier Olaizola (born 1969), Spanish footballer
José Luis Olaizola (born 1927), Spanish writer
Julio Olaizola (born 1950), Spanish footballer
Manuel Aierdi Olaizola (born 1967), Basque politician

Basque-language surnames